Gharibwal is a village that is a part of the Pind Dadan Khan Tehsil of Jhelum District in the Pakistani province of Punjab. It is located between the Khewra Salt Mines, Asia's largest salt mine, and the Jhelum River near Gharibwal Cement Factory.

Supposed tomb of Ham
In the first century, Romano-Jewish historian Josephus asserted that Ham (son of Noah) and his descendants had populated parts of Asia. In 1891, Hāfiz Shams ad-Dīn of Gulyana claimed that he had a dream in which he was informed the location of Ham's grave, who died at the age of 536. He subsequently established the present tomb in Gharibwal which is 78-foot long. However, many historians have dismissed this as mere rumour and unsupported.

References

External links 
Hussain college of health sciences

Populated places in Tehsil Pind Dadan Khan
Union councils of Pind Dadan Khan Tehsil